Senator Kruse may refer to:

Benjamin Kruse (politician) (born 1978), Minnesota State Senate
Dean Kruse (born 1941), Indiana State Senate
Dennis Kruse (born 1946), Indiana State Senate
Jeff Kruse (born 1951), Oregon State Senate
Lowen Kruse (1929–2017), Nebraska State Senate